Meskety (Meskita) is a rural locality (a selo) in Nozhay-Yurtovsky District of the Chechen Republic, Russia, located on the Aksay River.

Rural localities in Nozhay-Yurtovsky District